Grandma Got Run Over by a Reindeer is a 2000 animated Christmas television special directed by Phil Roman. The special was first released on home video in October, and then aired on The WB network on December 21, 2000. The title and story are based on the 1979 novelty song of the same name.

The film subsequently airs on The CW (the successor to The WB) and AMC, and also aired on Cartoon Network, Boomerang, and Freeform.

Plot
Jake Spankenheimer's grandmother owns a small general store in the town of Cityville. The store happens to be the only piece of property not owned by Austin Bucks, the wealthiest man in town, whose CEO corporation specializes in making Christmas easier and less involved for the town's busy residents. Grandma tells Austin that his method of trying to make Christmas easier is not really for the best and refuses to sell the store. Cousin Mel, who plans to sell the store anyway, sabotages Grandma's fruitcake by adding an ingredient with hopes that they won't sell.

Jake and his grandparents are the only ones in the family to believe in Santa Claus, further supported by them witnessing the film's signature accident occurring. The next morning, Grandma is indeed missing and the police find an imprint of her in the snow, along with her belongings. Cousin Mel finds a letter that she quickly hides from the others.

Nine months pass without Grandma and the store's business drops. During this time, Cousin Mel comes up with a new plan to sell the store to Austin by tricking Grandpa into giving her his power of attorney. When Jake objects, Austin agrees to give him another week in order to find Grandma before going through with the deal. Adamant in his belief that Santa ran over her, Jake emails Santa, and soon Quincy, Santa's head elf, comes to take Jake to the North Pole, explaining Santa took Grandma back to the North Pole for medical treatment, but she developed amnesia from the accident, and until receiving Jake's e-mail Santa had no idea of who she was. After Jake explains the situation, Santa, Quincy, and Grandma agree to go with him to stop the deal.

When they arrive in Cityville, however, Cousin Mel and her attorney, I.M. Slime, quickly trick Grandma into going with them. After Santa explains to Austin what has happened, Jake and Quincy discover that Grandma has gone missing once again. Cousin Mel uses the opportunity to accuse Santa of being behind her disappearance and put him on trial for kidnapping, leaving the scene of an accident, and "sleighicular negligence". Cousin Mel and I.M. Slime then plot to sue him, believing that someone who can pay for billions of presents must be incredibly wealthy.

Three months later, Daphne suspects that Cousin Mel may have been involved in Grandma's second disappearance, and Jake and Quincy follow her to a cabin in the woods where she and I.M. Slime are keeping Grandma out of sight. They rescue Grandma and find Santa's letter explaining what happened, that Cousin Mel had found at the site of Grandma's accident, and also what Cousin Mel added to Grandma's fruitcake that Christmas Eve night, which had the effect of "reindeer-nip" irresistible to reindeer. They restore Grandma's memory by feeding her some of her own fruitcakes and rush to the courthouse.

Confronted with the evidence, Cousin Mel and I.M. Slime are arrested for obstructing justice and "almost ruining Christmas," and the judge lets Santa go after finally discovering the truth. Austin, realizing how much the family cares about their business, offers to franchise Grandma's store throughout the country.

Characters
 Grandma Spankenheimer (voiced by Susan Blu) – Jake and Daphne's loving grandmother and Frank's mother who loves Christmas. Grandma is the owner of a general store in Cityville. Merchandise at the store includes ornaments, toys, and Grandma's famous "Killer Fruitcake".
 Jake Spankenheimer (voiced by Alex Doduk) – Jake leads the search for Grandma when she mysteriously disappears, and Grandma being hit by Santa's sleigh. A firm believer in Santa Claus, Jake proves his family wrong when he finds the real Santa Claus.
 Cousin Mel (voiced by Michele Lee) – Cousin Mel is a money-grubbing woman who wears too much makeup and jewelry and beats Grandpa at cards. Cousin Mel is out to sell the store to the wealthy Austin Bucks, and makes Santa Claus the fall guy in a lawsuit over Grandma's disappearance so she can get all his money. Her partner in crime was her lawyer, I.M. Slime, who was also in on Mel's scheme. At the end of the film, she's arrested, sent to prison, disowned, and is on Santa's naughty list for life. Other than simply "a cousin"' it's unclear as to her exact relationship within the family or even if she is a Spankenheimer.
 Grandpa Spankenheimer & The Narrator (both voiced by Elmo Shropshire) – Jake and Daphne's grandfather, Grandma's daffy husband and Frank's father. Grandpa accidentally gives Cousin Mel power of attorney, giving Cousin Mel the power to sell Spankenheimer's General Store to Austin Bucks. The narrator is the adult Jake telling the story.
 Austin Bucks (voiced by Cam Clarke) – A monopolizing store tycoon that wants to buy the store from the Spankenheimers, but near the end of the special, decides instead of buying out the Spankenheimers, he decides to franchise the store, which Grandma eventually accepts the offer to franchise the store. Bucks is completely unaware of Cousin Mel's plots and, in fact, gives Jake the opportunity to prove his story, despite not really believing it. He then turns against Cousin Mel and orders her arrest.
 Santa Claus (voiced by Jim Staahl) – A jolly old man who delivers gifts around the world on Christmas Eve. Santa accidentally runs over Grandma with his reindeer-drawn sleigh, and takes her to his hospital at his North Pole workshop.
 Mrs. Claus (voiced by Kathleen Barr) – She’s known for making cookies with the elves, caring for the reindeer, and preparing toys with her husband. She makes an appearance in this film reading an article in the newspaper about her husband getting arrested and later flying home with him after he was acquitted.
 Daphne Spankenheimer (voiced by Maggie Blue O'Hara) – Jake's older sister and Grandma and Grandpa's granddaughter. Daphne is a bit more skeptical and less apt to helping Grandma than Jake is, but she isn’t as apathetic as Cousin Mel. Despite this, she still cares about her brother and Grandma and Grandpa.
 Frank Spankenheimer (voiced by Scott McNeil) – Jake and Daphne's father and Grandma and Grandpa's son.
 Rita Spankenheimer (voiced by Kathleen Barr) – Jake and Daphne's mother and Grandma and Grandpa's daughter-in-law.
 I.M. Slime (voiced by Kathleen Barr) – Cousin Mel's money-loving attorney and accomplice. Sent to prison with Cousin Mel.
 Officers – (voiced by Jim Fisher and Kathleen Barr) – Two police officers who investigate Grandma's disappearance and later arrest Cousin Mel and I.M. Slime.
 Quincy – (voiced by Philip Maurice Hayes) – Santa's head elf who helps Jake rescue Grandma and clear Santa's name.
 The Judge – (voiced by Pauline Newstone) – The judge preceding over Santa Claus's trial for the disappearance of Grandma Spankenheimer.

Songs

The song "Grandpa's Gonna Sue The Pants Offa' Santa" became an internet meme on YouTube.

Home media
Warner Home Video (owned by Time Warner Entertainment, the then-part owner of the WB network) released Grandma Got Run Over by a Reindeer to VHS on October 31, 2000 and to DVD on October 16, 2001.

References

External links
 

2000 films
2000 animated films
2000s children's animated films
American children's animated comedy films
2000 comedy-drama films
American Christmas films
Animated Christmas films
Animated Christmas television specials
Television shows directed by Phil Roman
Films set in 1999
Films set in 2000
Christmas television specials
Direct-to-video animated films
American fantasy comedy films
Santa Claus in film
Santa Claus in television
Films based on songs
Films scored by Nathan Wang
American comedy-drama films
Film Roman television specials
2000s American films